Kandiyohi County is a county in the U.S. state of Minnesota. As of the 2020 census, its population is 43,732. As of November 20, 1871, its county seat is Willmar.

Kandiyohi County comprises the US Census Bureau's "Willmar, MN Micropolitan Statistical Area".

History
Kandiyohi County is named for a Dakota word meaning "where the buffalo fish come". (kandi’ - the buffalo fish + oh-hi’-yu - v. of hiyu - to come through). It was organized on March 20, 1858, with Kandiyohi established as the county seat in 1870 (it was then called Kandiyohi Station, as it was merely a stop on the railroad line). The original county occupied only the southern half of its current area. Development was slow, and in 1870 the state legislature called for Monongalia County to merge with Kandiyohi. It took until November 21, 1871, to agree on the centrally located Willmar as the county seat.

Geography
The terrain of Kandiyohi County consists of rolling hills, partly wooded, mostly devoted to agriculture. The territory slopes to the south and west, with the highest point near its northeastern corner, at 1,306' (398m) ASL. Kandiyohi County is one of seven southern Minnesota counties that have no forest soils; only prairie ecosystems of savannas and prairies exist.

Lakes

 Bass Lake
 Bear Lake
 Big Kandiyohi Lake
 Burr Oak Lake
 Calhoun Lake
 Cherry Lake
 Church Lake
 Crook Lake
 Diamond Lake
 Dog Lake
 Downs Lake
 Eagle Lake
 East Solomon Lake
 East Sunburg Lake
 Elkhorn Lake
 Ella Lake
 Emma Lake
 Florida Lake
 Foot Lake
 Games Lake
 George Lake
 Ging Lake
 Green Lake
 Hefta Lake
 Henchien Lake
 Henderson Lake
 Henium Lake
 Hubbard Lake
 Johnson Lake
 Knutsons Lake
 Lake Andrew
 Lake Carrie
 Lake Eight
 Lake Eleanor
 Lake Elizabeth
 Lake Kasota
 Lake Lillian
 Lake Minnetaga
 Lindgren Lake
 Little Kandiyohi Lake
 Long Lake (Dovre Township)
 Long Lake: (Irving and Roseville townships)
 Mamre Lake
 Mary Lake
 Middle Lake
 Mud Lake
 Nest Lake
 Norstedt Lake
 Norway Lake
 Olson Lake
 Otter Lake
 Point Lake
 Prairie Lake
 Ringo Lake
 Saint Johns Lake
 Schultz Lake
 Shoemaker Lake
 Skataas Lake
 Skull Lake
 Sperry Lake
 Stevens Lake
 Summit Lake
 Swan Lake (Colfax and Lake Andrew townships)
 Swan Lake: (Dovre and Willmar townships)
 Swan Lake: (Kandiyohi Township)
 Swan Lake: (Mamre Township)
 Swenson Lake
 Taits Lake
 Thompson Lake
 Timber Lake
 Twin Lakes
 Wagonga Lake
 West Solomon Lake
 West Sunburg Lake (part)
 Wheeler Lake
 Willmar Lake
 Woodcock Lake (Green Lake Township)
 Woodcock Lake: (New London and Green Lake townships)

Major highways

  U.S. Highway 12
  U.S. Highway 71

  Minnesota State Highway 4
  Minnesota State Highway 7
  Minnesota State Highway 9
  Minnesota State Highway 23

  Minnesota State Highway 40
  Minnesota State Highway 55
  Minnesota State Highway 104

Adjacent counties

 Stearns County (north)
 Meeker County (east)
 Renville County (south)
 Chippewa County (southwest)
 Swift County (west)
 Pope County (northwest)

Protected areas

 Burbank State Wildlife Management Area
 Dietrich Lange State Wildlife Management Area
 Oleander State Wildlife Management Area
 Ringo-Nest State Wildlife Management Area
 Roseville State Wildlife Management Area
 Sibley State Park
 Sunburg State Wildlife Management Area
 Yohi State Wildlife Management Area

Demographics

2020 census

Note: the US Census treats Hispanic/Latino as an ethnic category. This table excludes Latinos from the racial categories and assigns them to a separate category. Hispanics/Latinos can be of any race.

2000 census
As of the 2000 census, there were 41,203 people, 15,936 households, and 10,979 families residing in the county. The population density was 51.7/sqmi (20.0/km2). There were 18,415 housing units at an average density of 23.1/sqmi (8.92/km2). The racial makeup of the county was 93.62% White, 0.51% Black or African American, 0.33% Native American, 0.38% Asian, 0.07% Pacific Islander, 4.17% from other races, and 0.91% from two or more races. 8.00% of the population were Hispanic or Latino of any race. 31.4% were of German, 25.8% Norwegian, 9.9% Swedish and 5.6% Dutch ancestry.

There were 15,936 households, out of which 33.10% had children under the age of 18 living with them, 57.70% were married couples living together, 7.50% had a female householder with no husband present, and 31.10% were non-families. 25.70% of all households were made up of individuals, and 10.80% had someone living alone who was 65 years of age or older. The average household size was 2.53 and the average family size was 3.05.

The county population contained 26.60% under the age of 18, 9.50% from 18 to 24, 26.50% from 25 to 44, 22.50% from 45 to 64, and 14.90% who were 65 years of age or older. The median age was 37 years. For every 100 females there were 98.00 males. For every 100 females age 18 and over, there were 94.90 males.

The median income for a household in the county was $39,772, and the median income for a family was $48,016. Males had a median income of $32,272 versus $22,128 for females. The per capita income for the county was $19,627. About 5.90% of families and 9.20% of the population were below the poverty line, including 11.10% of those under age 18 and 7.90% of those age 65 or over.

Communities

Cities

 Atwater
 Blomkest
 Kandiyohi
 Lake Lillian
 New London
 Pennock
 Prinsburg
 Raymond
 Regal
 Spicer
 Sunburg
 Willmar (county seat)

Unincorporated communities

 Hawick
 Norway Lake
 Priam
 Roseland
 Svea

Townships

 Arctander Township
 Burbank Township
 Colfax Township
 Dovre Township
 East Lake Lillian Township
 Edwards Township
 Fahlun Township
 Gennessee Township
 Green Lake Township
 Harrison Township
 Holland Township
 Irving Township
 Kandiyohi Township
 Lake Andrew Township
 Lake Elizabeth Township
 Lake Lillian Township
 Mamre Township
 New London Township
 Norway Lake Township
 Roseland Township
 Roseville Township
 St. Johns Township
 Whitefield Township
 Willmar Township

Politics
Kandiyohi County voters have switched from Democratic to Republican in recent years. In no national election since 1996 has the county selected the Democratic Party candidate (as of 2020). However, Democratic incumbent Amy Klobuchar won the county in 2018 as she coasted to an easy reelection over Republican challenger Jim Newberger. Klobuchar also carried Kandiyohi County in her 2006 and 2012 victories.

See also
 Kandiyohi County Historical Society
 National Register of Historic Places listings in Kandiyohi County, Minnesota
 :Category:People from Willmar, Minnesota

References

External links
 Kandiyohi County & City of Willmar economic development Commission
 Kandiyohi County government website
 MNGenWebUSGenWeb website for Kandiyohi County, Minnesota

 
Minnesota counties
Minnesota placenames of Native American origin
1858 establishments in Minnesota Territory
Populated places established in 1858
Dakota toponyms